Bradford Public Library, formerly known as the Byers Masonic Lodge and Bradford City Hall, is a historic building in Bradford, Arkansas. Built in 1934 jointly by the Masonic lodge and the city government, the building originally functioned as the city hall and as a Masonic Hall until the lodge moved in 1960. The city hall later moved in 1995. The building was listed on the National Register of Historic Places in 1999, and has been used as a library since 2009.

The building is a two-story structure finished in fieldstone on the first level and stucco on the second. Its gable roof has exposed rafter ends, giving the building a bit of Craftsman styling.

See also
National Register of Historic Places listings in White County, Arkansas

References

External links

Clubhouses on the National Register of Historic Places in Arkansas
Former Masonic buildings in Arkansas
City halls in Arkansas
City and town halls on the National Register of Historic Places in Arkansas
National Register of Historic Places in White County, Arkansas
Government buildings completed in 1934
Libraries on the National Register of Historic Places in Arkansas
Cultural infrastructure completed in 1934
American Craftsman architecture in Arkansas
1934 establishments in Arkansas